Alcyonium acaule or Mediterranean sea-finger  is a species of soft coral in the family Alcyoniidae. It is found at moderate depths on shaded rocks in the Mediterranean Sea and adjoining parts of the Atlantic Ocean.

Description
Mediterranean sea-finger is a colonial coral forming clumps of yellow, pink, brown-red to brown orange fleshy masses of finger-like lobes. The colony can reach a height of 20 cm maximum. The body's surface is entirely covered by whitish polyps from the foot to the top of the lobes. As for all the soft coral, it uses its hydrostatic skeleton capacity to maintain and manage its body posture.

Distribution and habitat
This species is endemic to the Mediterranean Sea however its area of distribution overflows slightly and extends along the Portuguese and Spanish Atlantic coasts.
It is usually found between 12 and 135 m deep. Alcyonium acaule is a sciophilous animal that likes to avoid places exposed to unfiltered light and prefers shaded places such as overhangs or caves.

Ecology
In the Mediterranean Sea, Alcyonium acaule frequently forms dense agglomerations, often in association with the yellow cluster anemone (Parazoanthus axinellae). Other organisms in these biodiverse habitats include suspension feeders such as sponges, cnidarians, bryozoans and tunicates, and the rock is encrusted with coralline algae. There is space competition among these organisms and during a two-year research study, a number of small colonies of Alcyonium acaule disappeared, and very little growth of colonies occurred. Many colonies showed less feeding activity during the summer, with up to ninety percent becoming dormant.

References

External links
 

Alcyoniidae
Animals described in 1878